Noor Amin bin Ahmad (born 20 February 1982) is a Malaysian politician who has served as the Member of Parliament (MP) for Kangar since May 2018. He is a member of the People's Justice Party (PKR), a component party of the Pakatan Harapan (PH) opposition coalition. He has also served the State Chairman of PH of Perlis since May 2021.

Political career 
In the 2013 election, Amin represented the People's Justice Party (PKR) and faced Mat Hassan of the Barisan Nasional Party for the  state seat. He lost with a majority vote of 1,384.

In the 2018 election, he represented the PKR party and won the Kangar parliamentary seat, defeating Barisan Nasional candidate Ramli Shariff and giving BN its first defeat for a parliamentary seat in Perlis state since independence.

Election results

References 

Living people
People from Perlis
Members of the Dewan Rakyat
People's Justice Party (Malaysia) politicians
1982 births